Momir Talić (15 July 1942 – 28 May 2003)  was a Bosnian Serb general in the Yugoslav People's Army and later the Army of Republika Srpska.

Military career
Talić was the Chief of Staff of the JNA 5th Corps in Banja Luka as of 26 July 1991. He was promoted to Commander of the same corps, which was renamed 1st Krajina Corps of the Republika Srpska Army (VRS) on 19 March 1992. In the aftermath of the breakup of Yugoslavia, Republika Srpska was one of many states established. Territorial and other conflicts between the new states led to the Bosnian War.

Trial for war crimes
Talić was indicted on 14 March 1999 for war crimes, including genocide, torture and wanton destruction. He was arrested on 25 August 1999 in Austria. He pleaded not guilty to all the charges against him.

Talić was initially tried with Radoslav Brđanin, a politician and President of the ARK Crisis Staff, but the trials were separated on 20 September 2002 due to Talić's ill health. Talić died in Belgrade on 28 May 2003.

References

External links
 International Criminal Tribunal for the former Yugoslavia

1942 births
2003 deaths
People from Banja Luka
Serbs of Bosnia and Herzegovina
Generals of the Yugoslav People's Army
People indicted by the International Criminal Tribunal for the former Yugoslavia